O'Neals is an unincorporated community in Madera County, California.

The O'Neals post office opened in 1887. The name honored Charles O'Neal, merchant and first postmaster.  It is the home of Frank Bigelow, elected to represent the California's 5th State Assembly district in the state legislature in 2012.

References

External links
O'Neal Website: O'Neals, Madera County 

Unincorporated communities in California
Unincorporated communities in Madera County, California